Daday District is a district of the Kastamonu Province of Turkey. Its seat is the town of Daday. Its area is 843 km2, and its population is 8,073 (2021).

Composition
There is one municipality in Daday District:
 Daday

There are 60 villages in Daday District:

 Akılçalman
 Akpınar
 Aktaştekke
 Alipaşa
 Arabacılar
 Bağışlar
 Bastak
 Bayırköy
 Bayramlı
 Beykoz
 Bezirgan
 Bolatlar
 Boyalıca
 Boyalılar
 Budaklı
 Çamkonak		
 Çamlıbel
 Çavuşlu
 Çayırlı
 Çayözü
 Çölmekçiler
 Davutköy
 Değirmencik
 Değirmenözü
 Demirce
 Dereköy
 Dereözü
 Elmayazı
 Ertaş
 Fasıllar
 Gökören
 Görük
 Hasanağa
 Hasanşeyh
 İnciğez
 Kapaklı
 Karaağaç
 Karacaağaç
 Karacaören
 Karamık
 Kavakyayla
 Kayabağı
 Kayı
 Kızılörencik
 Kızsini
 Koççuğaz
 Köşeler
 Küten
 Okluk
 Örencik
 Sarıçam
 Sarpun
 Selalmaz
 Siyahlar
 Sorkun
 Sorkuncuk
 Tüfekçi
 Uzbanlar
 Üyükören
 Yazıcameydan

References

Districts of Kastamonu Province